The Romano R.6 was a transport aircraft built by Romano in France in the early 1930s. It was a three engine, high wing monoplane transport of all-metal construction. A longer wing-span colonial police transport was also built as the Romano R.16.

Specifications

References

1930s French civil aircraft
R.6
Trimotors
High-wing aircraft
Aircraft first flown in 1932